is a passenger railway station located in the city of Chichibu, Saitama, Japan, operated by the private railway operator Chichibu Railway.

Lines
It is also served by through services to and from the Seibu Chichibu Line.

Station layout
The station is staffed and consists of a single side platform serving a single bi-directional track.

Adjacent stations

History
Urayamaguchi Station opened on 15 March 1930.

Passenger statistics
In fiscal 2018, the station was used by an average of 183 passengers daily.>

Surrounding area

 Arakawa River
 
 Urayama Dam
 Mount Bukō

See also
 List of railway stations in Japan

References

External links

 Urayamaguchi Station information (Saitama Prefectural Government) 
 Urayamaguchi Station timetable 

Railway stations in Japan opened in 1930
Railway stations in Saitama Prefecture
Chichibu, Saitama